The Bride Can't Wait (Italian: La sposa non può attendere) is a 1949 Italian comedy film directed by Gianni Franciolini and starring Gino Cervi, Gina Lollobrigida and Odile Versois.

It was shot at the Farnesina Studios in Rome. The film earned around 15 million lira at the box office.

Plot

Cast 
Gino Cervi as Anselmo Brunelli 
Gina Lollobrigida as Donata Venturi
Odile Versois as Maria
Giacomo Furia as Giovanni
Leopoldo Valentini as Capostazione
Ave Ninchi as Miss Evelina 
Nando Bruno as  Mr. Venturi
Ada Colangeli as Sister Celeste 
Adriano Ambrogi as Doctor 
Cosetta Greco as  Young Nun

References

External links

1949 films
1949 comedy films
Italian comedy films
Films directed by Gianni Franciolini
Films about weddings
Italian black-and-white films
1940s Italian films
1940s Italian-language films